Helia Águeda Molina Milman (born 2 April 1947) is a Chilean physician, educator, and politician. She served as Minister of Public Health in 2014, during the second government of Michelle Bachelet. She is currently a professor at the University of Santiago's Faculty of Medical Sciences.

She has worked as a consultant at the Pan American Health Organization (PAHO), World Health Organization (WHO), UNICEF, Inter-American Development Bank (IADB), and other international agencies.

Professional career
Helia Molina was born in Santiago on 2 April 1947. She received a degree in medical sciences at the University of Chile in 1971, and the title of surgeon at the same university in 1973. She obtained a master's degree in public health at the University of Chile in 1999.

She has been dean of the University of Santiago's Faculty of Medical Sciences since 2017, in addition to serving as an academic of that house of studies. Molina has coordinated and participated in several national and international studies and projects. She is the author of numerous publications in books, technical documents, and scientific journals in the field of children and their rights, as well as public policies for early childhood development.

In conjunction with teaching, Molina was a clinical doctor at the Sótero del Río Hospital's pediatric service until 1990. From 1991 to 1995, she served as director of primary care for the Oriente Metropolitan Health Service. From 1995 to 1999 she advised the Ministry of Health on primary care and health promotion. In the field of scientific societies, she was director, vice-president, and the first woman to be president of the Chilean Pediatric Society (1983–1987) and director of the Chilean Epidemiology Society (1999).

Between 2000 and 2004 she worked at the PAHO as a regional adviser on children's health for Latin America and the Caribbean. Back in Chile, she returned to the PUC, and in 2006 she became a member of the Children's Council created by President Michelle Bachelet in her first government.

From 2005 to 2008 she was a member of the Knowledge Network on Child Development, within the framework of the WHO Commission on Social Determinants of Health.

Political career

Minister of Public Health
In January 2014, Molina was appointed Minister of Public Health by the then President-elect, Michelle Bachelet, for her second government. She assumed the Health portfolio on 11 March 2014.

On 30 December 2014, in an interview given to the evening paper La Segunda, she said that "in all  [private, in pejorative terms] clinics, many conservative families have gotten their daughters abortions," pointing out a double standard where access to abortions was available to rich citizens but prohibited for the poor. This sparked a controversy, which led the government to issue a communiqué stating that the minister's statements were strictly personal. On the same day, Molina presented her resignation from office, which was accepted by the president.

2016 mayoral candidacy
During May 2016, Helia Molina entered the municipal primaries for mayor of Ñuñoa for the New Majority. Her campaign was officially launched on 28 May 2016, from the Plaza Villa Olímpica in Ñuñoa. In the primary election on 19 June, Molina obtained 35.17% of the votes, being nominated as candidate for mayor for the New Majority.

In the election, Molina obtained 22,373 votes (35.7%), losing to the incumbent, who received 30,944 votes (49.4%).

Other activities 
 Partnership for Maternal, Newborn & Child Health (PMNCH), Member of the Board

Selected publications

References

External links

 

1947 births
21st-century Chilean women politicians
21st-century Chilean politicians
Chilean Ministers of Health
Chilean surgeons
Living people
Party for Democracy (Chile) politicians
Politicians from Santiago
Academic staff of the Pontifical Catholic University of Chile
University of Chile alumni
Academic staff of the University of Santiago, Chile
Women government ministers of Chile
Government ministers of Chile